Waheed Ismael (Arabic:وحيد إسماعيل) (born 1 July 1983) is an Emirati footballer. He currently plays as a defender.

External links

References

Emirati footballers
1983 births
Living people
Al Shabab Al Arabi Club Dubai players
Al-Wasl F.C. players
Ajman Club players
UAE Pro League players
Association football defenders